Jean de Nogaret de La Valette (1527– December 18, 1575) was a Cavalry Colonel and Lieutenant General of France. He also participated in the Battle of Dreux in 1562, Battle of Moncontour and Battle of Jarnac in 1569 and the Siege of La Rochelle (1572–1573).

He was born at Caumont-Guienne, the son of Pierre Nogaret de La Valette (1497–1553) and Marguerite de L'Isle de St. Aignan (1499–1535), and died in battle at the Siege of La Rochelle (1572-1573).  

With his wife, Jeanne de St Lary de Bellegarde, he had a son, Jean Louis de Nogaret de La Valette (1554–1642) and a daughter, Helen Nogaret de La Valette (1548-?).

References

1527 births
1575 deaths
French generals
French military personnel killed in action
16th-century French people